Gilby Clarke is a best of album by former Guns N' Roses guitarist Gilby Clarke, released in 2007.

Track listing

All songs by Clarke unless otherwise stated.

 "Cure Me... Or Kill Me..." – 4:56
 "Tijuana Jail" – 5:08
 "Skin & Bones" – 3:17
 "Alien" – 2:48
 "I'm Nobody" – 3:00
 "Judgement Day" – 3:51
 "Motorcycle Cowboys (Live)" – 4:14
 "Wasn't Yesterday Great" – 2:45
 "It's Good Enough for Rock N' Roll" – 3:12
 "Punk Rock Pollution" – 2:29
 "Kilroy Was Here" – 2:55
 "Bourbon Street Blues" (Words by Clarke, music by Clarke/Jo Almeida) – 2:33
 "Monkey Chow (Live)" – 4:54
 "Dropping Out" (as Col. Parker)
 "Can't Get That Stuff" (as Col. Parker)
 "Black" (re-recorded version featuring Dilana)

iTunes Track listing
 "Cure Me... Or Kill Me..." – 4:58
 "Tijuana Jail" – 5:09
 "Black" (re-recorded version featuring Dilana) - 3:01
 "Skin & Bones" – 3:19
 "Wasn't Yesterday Great" – 2:48
 "It's Good Enough for Rock N' Roll" – 3:14
 "Punk Rock Pollution" – 2:31
 "Kilroy Was Here" – 2:57
 "Bourbon Street Blues" (Words by Clarke, music by Clarke/Jo Almeida) – 2:30
 "Can't Get That Stuff" (as Col. Parker) - 3:13
 "Dropping Out" (as Col. Parker) - 3:12
 "I'm Nobody" – 2:49
 "Alien" – 3:24
 "Judgement Day" – 3:44

Gilby Clarke albums
2007 greatest hits albums